Geir Frigård (born 3 November 1970) is a Norwegian former professional footballer who played as a forward. He played five times for the Norway national team, scoring one goal. In 1997–98, he was top scorer in the Austrian Bundesliga. He retired from playing in 2007.

International career
Frigård made his Norway national team debut in a friendly on 15 January 1994 against USA which Norway lost 2–1. He scored his only goal in a 1–0 win on 7 September 1994 in a UEFA Euro 1996 qualification match against Belarus.

Coaching career
After retiring at the end of 2007, Frigård started his coaching career with Eidsvold Turn. On 21 May 2020, after a lot years coaching various youth national teams, Frigård was presented as the new assistant coach for Hamarkameratene. On 7 August 2020, he was appointed interim head coach after Espen Olsen returned to his role as sporting director. On 15 August 2020, he again became an assistant coach after Kjetil Rekdal was hired as the new head coach.

On 20 December 2021, he was hired as an assistant coach for Rosenborg BK.

Career statistics

International goals
Scores and results list Norway's goal tally first, score column indicates score after each Frigård goal.

Honours
Individual
 Austrian Bundesliga top scorer: 1998

References

1970 births
Living people
People from Nes, Akershus
Sportspeople from Viken (county)
Norwegian footballers
Association football forwards
Norway international footballers
Lillestrøm SK players
Kongsvinger IL Toppfotball players
LASK players
Tennis Borussia Berlin players
CS Sedan Ardennes players
Lierse S.K. players
Hamarkameratene players
Ligue 1 players
Eliteserien players
Belgian Pro League players
Austrian Football Bundesliga players
2. Bundesliga players
Norwegian expatriate footballers
Expatriate footballers in Austria
Expatriate footballers in Germany
Expatriate footballers in France
Expatriate footballers in Belgium
Norwegian expatriate sportspeople in Austria
Norwegian expatriate sportspeople in Germany
Norwegian expatriate sportspeople in Belgium
Norwegian expatriate sportspeople in France